The 1927 Chatham Cup was the fifth annual nationwide knockout football competition in New Zealand.

The competition was run on a regional basis, with five regional associations (Auckland, Wellington, Manawatu, Canterbury, and Otago) each holding separate qualifying rounds. 

Teams taking part in the final rounds included Ponsonby (who defeated Auckland Thistle in the Auckland regional final), St. Andrews (Manawatu), Northern (Dunedin), Nomads (Christchurch), and Wellington Marist (who defeated YMCA in the Wellington regional final).

Teams

Auckland
Waro Wanderers, Ponsonby, Northcote, R.N.Z.N.A.F.C. (Navy), (Auckland) Thistle, Auckland Y.M.C.A., Onehunga A.F.C., Tramways, North Shore AFC, Huntly, Huntly Thistle AFC, Rotowaro, Pukemiro.

Wellington
Mental Hospital A.F.C., Welgasco, Wellington Marist, Diamonds, Wellington Y.M.C.A., Swifts, Johnsonville, South Wellington,  Institute Old Boys', Petone FC, (Wellington) Thistle.

Canterbury
Nomads, Christchurch Thistle, Western A.F.C., Christchurch Technical.

Manawatu
St. Andrew's, Athletic (Palmerston North).

Otago

Northern AFC

Sunnyside
The 1926 champions Sunnyside, as a result of a disagreement with the Canterbury Football Association (C.F.A.) regarding fixtures, withdrew from all competitions in April 1927. A request was made to the C.F.A. to schedule three home games a month for Sunnyside owing to an allowance of only one Saturday per month leave for staff from the hospital, it was explained by the secretary of Sunnyside, Mr. Iain McLeod in a letter to the Christchurch Star. McLeod reinforced to the paper that the purpose of the team was for entertainment of the patients and now the hospital had begun negotiations with the rugby football union to switch codes. A £41 payment to Sunnyside by the N.Z.F.A via the C.F.A. was also clarified by McLeod after reimbursement of 3s 8d had been received by the champion players after an expense of £4/player to travel to Dunedin and Wellington in 1926. The sum forward to the club by the N.Z.F.A for the Chatham Cup win, raised questions in the papers prior to McLeod disclosing a considerable deduction of more than £32 by the C.F.A. due to prior arrangement. A number of Sunnyside players joined alternate association clubs in Christchurch after the decision to withdraw.

The 1927 final
The final was played at Newtown Park, Wellington - the second of three finals to be held at that venue. In 1928 the final moved to the Basin Reserve, a venue which was used regularly until the 1970s; Newtown Park was not to host the final again until 1989.

In the final, which was noted by contemporary sources as being a dour match, Ponsonby made good use of a stiff Wellington wind in the first half, with goals from Gerry Hunter, Bob Innes, and J. Adshead. In the second half, the wind favoured Northern, who pulled two goals back through A. McDowell and A. McTavish. Northern pressed for the equaliser, spending long periods close to Ponsonby's goalmouth, but the Auckland side's defence held and the survived to win 3–2.

Northern protest 
On returning to Dunedin from Wellington, the Northern club officials made the decision to protest the result of the final, on the grounds of an oversight of the rules regarding player eligibility and was not prepared to accept the N.Z.F.A.  decision. It was also agreed by the Northern club that unless the matter was reconsidered by the N.Z.F.A. the case and the whole facts governing it would be set in motion to be placed before the Football Association in England. A football contributor to the Otago Daily Times had even gone so far as to claim the "Ponies" sportsmanship was poor. New Zealand representative Tom McCormack had travelled with the Northern side to Wellington, but prior to the match commencing McCormack was deemed injured. A twelfth player selected by the Otago Association, Tom Ruddiman, a member of Northern for the last decade, was available to replace McCormack, but the N.Z.F.A. declared this a breach of the cup rules. The captain of Ponsonby Bob Innes stated he was bound by the cup rules and did not have any power to agree to any infringement. The rule in question read as follows, "In the competition proper each player, except a player who has played for his club in the previous season, and has never played for any other club, must have played twice for his club in the current season seven days at least previous to the match.” Ruddiman had not met these stipulations, though he had played for Northern in the 1927 season. To file the protest with the N.Z.F.A. cost Northern a £2 2s fee, a reply was received late in 1927 dismissing the protest and retaining the fee.

Results

Rounds

Wellington teams: Institute, Thistle, Petone, Johnsonville and South Wellington first round byes.

Match abandoned due to weather *

Semi-finals

Final

Teams

Ponsonby: H. Watts, M. Williams, T. Pickett, John Morrison, George Wright, J. Mooney, Gerry Hunter, Clem Bell, Bob Innes, J. Tomilty, J. Adshead

Northern: A. McQuarrie, L. Coates, Jim Scoular, Alex Perry, Hugh Munsie, Reg Cherry, A. McDowell, Tom McHugh, A. McTavish, Tom McCormack, Rab McLean

References

Rec.Sport.Soccer Statistics Foundation New Zealand 1927 page

Chatham Cup
Chatham Cup
Chatham Cup